Tonlesap Airlines Corp. was an airline with its head office in Phnom Penh, Cambodia. It was a regional carrier operating a scheduled domestic network and regional flights to neighbouring countries. Its main base was Phnom Penh International Airport.

The airline made its first flight on January 21, 2011.

As of August 2013, the airline appears to be defunct.

Destinations 
In October 2012, Tonlesap Airlines operated scheduled passenger flights to the following destinations:

 China
Beijing - Beijing Capital International Airport
Hong Kong - Hong Kong International Airport
Ningbo - Ningbo Lishe International Airport
Shanghai - Shanghai Pudong International Airport
 Cambodia
Siem Reap - Siem Reap International Airport Hub
 Taiwan
Kaohsiung - Kaohsiung International Airport
Taipei - Taiwan Taoyuan International Airport 
 Thailand
Pattaya - U-Tapao International Airport
 South Korea
Incheon - Incheon International Airport

Fleet 
As of October 2013, the airline has 0 planes in its inventory.

In October 2012, the Tonlesap Airlines fleet consisted of the following aircraft:

References

External links

 Official website

Airlines established in 2011
Airlines disestablished in 2013
Defunct airlines of Cambodia
Cambodian companies established in 2011